In mathematical analysis, Dini continuity is a refinement of continuity. Every Dini continuous function is continuous. Every Lipschitz continuous function is Dini continuous.

Definition
Let  be a compact subset of a metric space (such as ), and let  be a function from  into itself.

The function  is called Dini-continuous if

An equivalent condition is that, for any ,

See also
 Dini test — a condition similar to local Dini continuity implies convergence of a Fourier transform.

References

Mathematical analysis